Ed Simmons (June 18, 1919 - May 18, 1998) was an American producer and screenwriter. In his early career, he partnered with Norman Lear, writing for Martin and Lewis on The Colgate Comedy Hour. He won five Primetime Emmy Awards and was nominated for eight more in the categories Outstanding Writing and Outstanding Variety Series for his work on the television programs The Red Skelton Show and The Carol Burnett Show.

Simmons was married and divorced three times. He had two children with first wife Elaine: son Kenneth (who predeceased him in 1972) and daughter Erica. Simmons died in May 1998 of a cardiac arrest at the Cedars-Sinai Medical Center in Los Angeles, California, at the age of 78.

References

External links 

1919 births
1998 deaths
People from Boston
American male screenwriters
American television writers
American male television writers
American television producers
Primetime Emmy Award winners